Univers'l is a 1997 American docudrama film written and directed by Anna Nicholas and featuring Tony Todd.

Cast
Robert Villalobos as Rodrigo
Tony Todd as Marcus
Berengere Gallian
Mimi Savage as Yolanda
Jackie Huynh
Lee Mary Weilnau
Marshall Manesh
Ali Pourtash
Mehr Mansuri
Monireh Lanzaro
Avner Garbi as Yehuda
Aviv Tenenbaum
Brad Fisher as Bob
Dian Tran
Denise Blasor as Maria
Lana Huynh
Agnete Strand as Swedish Equestrian
Anna Karin
Ann Osmond as Annette
Anna Nicholas

Release
The film was released at the Mill Valley Film Festival on September 15, 1997.

Reception
Lisa Alspector of the Chicago Reader gave the film a negative review and wrote, "But for the most part the repetitive narrative succeeds only in creating a low-grade suspense that’s purposeless, patronizing, and even obnoxious."

References

External links